The 2002 MasterCard Truck Series was the first season of the MasterCard Truck Series. After eight races Jorge Goeters was proclaimed champion.

Results

Standings

References

MasterCard Truck Series
MasterCard Truck Series season